is the traditional name of the month of June in the Japanese calendar. It can also refer to:

Suu Minazuki (水無月すう), Japanese manga artist
Japanese destroyer Minazuki, destroyer of the Imperial Japanese Navy

Fictional characters
 Karen Minazuki, a character in Yes! Pretty Cure 5

Japanese-language surnames